John Livingston Lowes (December 20, 1867, Decatur, Indiana – August 15, 1945, Boston, Massachusetts) was an American scholar and critic of English literature, specializing in Samuel Taylor Coleridge and Geoffrey Chaucer.

Life
Lowes earned a B.A. from Washington and Jefferson College in 1888 and did postgraduate work in Germany and at Harvard University. He taught mathematics at Washington and Jefferson College until 1891 when he received his M.A.

From 1909 to 1918 he worked as an English professor at Washington University in St. Louis, where he also served as dean of arts and sciences. From 1918 to 1939 he taught English at Harvard. In 1919 he was the Lowell Institute lecturer and the author of Convention and Revolt in Poetry. His grandfather was David Elliott, who had served as President of Washington College.

Lowes died in Boston, Massachusetts, aged 77.

Works

Coleridge
Lowes' most famous work is The Road to Xanadu: A Study in the Ways of the Imagination (Houghton Mifflin, 1927), which examines the sources of Coleridge's The Rime of the Ancient Mariner and Kubla Khan. Using Coleridge's notebook and other papers at the Bristol Library, Lowes put together a list of books that the poet read before and during the time he composed his poems. The trick was to connect images and ideas in the poems to images and ideas in Coleridge's reading. Though later critics have disputed both Lowes' findings and method, The Road to Xanadu  according to Toby Litt, an English author, it is 'a book of a lifetime': "Its argument, that Coleridge had one of the most extraordinary minds the world has ever seen, is there on every page"; it "is one of the books which helped me understand what writing is."

Chaucer
Lowes' book on Chaucer (1934), building on the work of George Lyman Kittredge, treats the poet not just as the "father of English poetry" but as, along with Shakespeare and Milton, English literature's greatest poet. The book greatly influenced E. Talbot Donaldson and other eminent mid-20th-century Chaucerians.

Critiques and other writings
The Prologue to the Legend of Good Women Considered in Its Chronological Relations was published by Lowes in 1905
 Convention and Revolt in Poetry following up in 1919 with his major critique on Free Verse and poetry  
Of Reading Books - Four Essays followed in 1929 and
 Selected Poems of Amy Lowell as editor  in 1928 with
 Essays in appreciation  - first published in 1936 and 
 A Leaf from the 1611 King James Bible in 1937

References

External links

WWI military service/photo Image of Livingston Lowes
Pearson Education
Book of a Lifetime, Toby Litt on The Road to Xanadu, The Independent 29 February 2008

American literary critics
American essayists
Harvard University alumni
Harvard University faculty
Writers from Boston
Washington University in St. Louis faculty
1867 births
1945 deaths
Washington & Jefferson College alumni
Washington & Jefferson College faculty
People from Decatur, Indiana
Samuel Taylor Coleridge
Fellows of the Medieval Academy of America
Corresponding Fellows of the British Academy
Presidents of the Modern Language Association